Cristina Makoli Biere was an Equatoguinean politician. In 1968 she was one of the first two women elected to the National Assembly.

Biography
In the 1968 parliamentary elections Makoli was a candidate for the National Liberation Movement, and was one of two women elected to the National Assembly alongside Lorenza Matute. After being elected, she sat on the Industry and Mines Committee.

References

Date of birth unknown
Possibly living people
Equatoguinean women in politics
National Liberation Movement of Equatorial Guinea politicians
Members of the Chamber of Deputies (Equatorial Guinea)